Alexander Gabriel Holtz (born 23 January 2002) is a Swedish professional ice hockey forward for the Utica Comets of the American Hockey League (AHL) as a prospect to the New Jersey Devils of the National Hockey League (NHL). He was selected seventh overall by the Devils in the 2020 NHL Entry Draft.

Early life 
Holtz was born on 23 January 2002 in Stockholm. His father, Magnus Holtz (born Andersson), is a former ice hockey player who played two seasons for Västerviks IK. He also has an older brother, David. As a youngster, Holtz played several sports such as football, tennis, golf, and basketball, but eventually chose to bet on hockey.

He started his hockey career in Boo IF at a young age and has since childhood followed his big brother who also played hockey. His father was the coach of Nacka HK at this time. Holtz already made his debut as a 13-year-old in a junior context when he played in U16 with Nacka/Farsta FoC and their U16 division 1 team during the 2014–15 season. Then there were two more seasons with the U16 team in Nacka where he performed so well that he was promoted to their J18 Elit team in the 2016–17 season. During those years, he averaged almost two points per game - even though he was two years younger than most he played against.

He was named for the Stockholm South team in the national junior hockey tournament TV-pucken in 2017 and scored 6 goals and 10 points in 6 games. Holtz was awarded the Sven Tumba award as the best forward of the tournament.

Playing career

Djurgårdens IF 
Holtz moved to Djurgårdens IF for the 2017–18 season to play in the club's junior teams. Holtz made his professional debut in the Swedish Hockey League on 29 January 2019 in a home game against Färjestad BK. At the conclusion of the J20 SuperElit regular season, Holtz was the leading goal scorer with 30 goals in 38 games. The J20 playoffs ended with a third place for Holtz and Djurgården.

Holtz began the 2019–20 season by playing with Djurgårdens IF in the 2019–20 Champions Hockey League, a European ice hockey tournament. In the first game against Polish GKS Tychy, Holtz scored two goals. He recorded his first SHL point in the league premiere on 14 September when assisting Michael Haga to the 1–1 equalizer in the 4–2 win against Linköping HC. In the next game on 17 September, Holtz scored his first and second SHL goal against goaltender Viktor Fasth of Växjö Lakers in a 5–3 win. Holtz extended his contract with Djurgårdens IF on 23 September by two years, allowing him to play with the club until the 2021–22 SHL season.

In his first full season in the SHL in the 2020–21 campaign, Holtz appeared in a career-high 40 regular season games with Djurgårdens IF collecting 7 goals and 11 assists to set new career mark of 18 points. After co-leading the club in postseason scoring with four points in three games, Holtz signed a three-year, entry-level contract with the New Jersey Devils on 19 April 2021, as well as an amateur try-out with their American Hockey League affiliate, the Binghamton Devils.

New Jersey Devils 
Holtz moved to North America permanently for the 2021–22 season. Following the conclusion of the NHL preseason, Holtz was assigned to the AHL's Utica Comets, where he finished among the top rookie scorers, marking 26 goals and 51 points in 52 games.

Career statistics

Regular season and playoffs

International

References

External links
 

2002 births
Binghamton Devils players
Djurgårdens IF Hockey players
Living people
National Hockey League first-round draft picks
New Jersey Devils draft picks
New Jersey Devils players
Ice hockey people from Stockholm
Swedish ice hockey left wingers
Utica Comets players